The Roman Catholic Diocese of Mpika is a Latin rite suffragan diocese in the ecclesiastical province of the Metropolitan Archbishop of Kasama, also in Zambia.

Its cathedral episcopal see is the Cathedral of St. Joseph the Worker, in the city of Mpika.
It also has a former Cathedral, now Church of St. Maria Magdalena de Pazzi, in Ilondola.

History 
 It was established on May 23, 1933 as Mission "sui iuris" of Lwangwa  from the Apostolic Vicariate of Bangueolo
 On July 1, 1937 it was promoted as Apostolic Vicariate of Lwangwa (still exempt, but entitled to a titular bishop) 
 Renamed on March 8, 1951 as Apostolic Vicariate of Abercorn
 On April 25, 1959 it was promoted as Diocese of Abercorn, losing its exempt status by joining the province of Kasama
 On November 22, 1967, it was renamed as Diocese of Mbala
 On April 26, 1991, renamed as Diocese of Mbala – Mpika
 Finally on September 9, 1994 it was renamed as Diocese of Mpika

Missionary and Episcopal Ordinaries 
All Roman rite; many missionary members of the Latin congregation White Fathers (M. Afr.)

Ecclesiastical superior of the Mission sui iuris of Lwangwa
 Father John van Sambeek, M. Afr. (1933.05.23 – 1936.11.19), later Titular Bishop of Gergis (1936.11.19 – 1953.03.25) & Apostolic Vicar of Tanganyika (Tanzania) (1936.11.19 – 1946.05.10), Apostolic Vicar of Kigoma (Tanzania) (1946.05.10 – 1953.03.25), promoted first Bishop of Kigoma (1953.03.25 – 1957.11.22), emeritate as Titular Bishop of Tracula (1957.11.22 – 1966.12.25)

Apostolic Vicars of Lwangwa  
 Heinrich Horst, M. Afr., Titular Bishop of Hermonthis (1938.05.21 – death 1946)
 Joost Van den Biesen, M. Afr., Titular Bishop of Tullia (see) (1948.02.12 – 1951.03.08 see below)

Apostolic Vicars of Abercorn 
 Joost Van den Biesen, M. Afr. (see above 1951.03.08 – retired 1958.01.24; Lay state 1967)
 Adolf Fürstenberg, M. Afr. (1958.12.11 – 1959.04.25 see below), Titular Bishop of Termessus (1958.12.11 – 1959.04.25)Suffragan Bishop of Abercorn 
 Adolf Fürstenberg, M. Afr. (see above 1959.04.25 – 1967.11.22 see below)Suffragan Bishops of Mbala  Adolf Fürstenberg, M. Afr. (see above 1967.11.22 – retired 1987.03.07)
 Telesphore George Mpundu (1987.03.07 – 1991.04.26 see below)Suffragan Bishop of Mbala – Mpika 
 Telesphore George Mpundu (see above 1991.04.26 – 1994.09.09 see below)Suffragan Bishops of Mpika Telesphore George Mpundu (see above 1994.09.09 – 2004.10.01), later Coadiutor Archbishop of Lusaka (2004.10.01 – 2006.10.28) and Metropolitan of Lusaka (2006.10.28 – 2018.01.30), 
President of Zambia Episcopal Conference (2014.07 – 2018.01.30)Apostolic Administrator  Father Robert Lavertu, M. Afr. (2007.09 – 2008.07.17) (no other office) Ignatius Chama (2008.07.17 - 2012.01.12 see below)Apostolic administrator Ignatius Chama, Metropolitan of Kasama (see above'' 2012.01.12 – ...):)
 Justin Mulenga (2015.12.23 – 2020.03.20)
 Edwin Mulandu (2021.04.24 – ...)

See also 
 Roman Catholicism in Zambia

Source and External links 
 GCatholic.org, with incumbent biography links
 Catholic Hierarchy
 Diocese of Mpika website

Roman Catholic dioceses in Zambia
Christian organizations established in 1933
Roman Catholic dioceses and prelatures established in the 20th century
1933 establishments in Northern Rhodesia
Roman Catholic Ecclesiastical Province of Kasama